Lewis Township is a township in Northumberland County, Pennsylvania, United States.  The population at the 2010 Census was 1,915, an increase over the figure of 1,862 tabulated in 2000.

History
The Hower-Slote House was listed on the National Register of Historic Places in 1979.

Geography

According to the United States Census Bureau, the township has a total area of 26.4 square miles (68.3 km2), all  land.

Demographics

As of the census of 2000, there were 1,862 people, 636 households, and 550 families residing in the township.  The population density was 70.6 people per square mile (27.3/km2).  There were 663 housing units at an average density of 25.1/sq mi (9.7/km2).  The racial makeup of the township was 99.36% White, 0.16% African American, 0.05% Native American, 0.16% Asian, 0.05% from other races, and 0.21% from two or more races. Hispanic or Latino of any race were 0.21% of the population.

There were 636 households, out of which 36.5% had children under the age of 18 living with them, 79.1% were married couples living together, 3.6% had a female householder with no husband present, and 13.4% were non-families. 11.6% of all households were made up of individuals, and 6.0% had someone living alone who was 65 years of age or older.  The average household size was 2.89, and the average family size was 3.11.

In the township the population was spread out, with 25.7% under the age of 18, 7.9% from 18 to 24, 26.0% from 25 to 44, 28.3% from 45 to 64, and 12.0% who were 65 years of age or older.  The median age was 39 years. For every 100 females, there were 103.9 males.  For every 100 females age 18 and over, there were 101.0 males.

The median income for a household in the township was $41,406, and the median income for a family was $44,922. Males had a median income of $32,101 versus $21,767 for females. The per capita income for the township was $16,876.  About 3.9% of families and 7.6% of the population were below the poverty line, including 14.4% of those under age 18 and 5.6% of those age 65 or over.

References

Populated places established in 1773
Townships in Northumberland County, Pennsylvania
Townships in Pennsylvania